En las Buenas y en las Malas (In Good and Bad Times) is the title of the 27th studio album released by Mexican performer José José on June 12, 1990. It was produced by Daniel Freiberg and Oscar Lopez. The album included the number-one single "Amnesia", and the hits "Atrapado" and "Un hotel en vez de corazón".

Track listing
This information adapted from Allmusic.

Chart performance

See also
List of best-selling Latin albums

References

1990 albums
José José albums
Spanish-language albums